Roy del espacio (English: Roy of Space or Roy from Space) is a 1983 Mexican animated science fiction film produced and directed by Hector López Carmona, Rafael Ángel Gil and Ulises Pérez Aguirre. Produced from 1979 to 1982, it is one of the first feature-length Mexican animated films ever made. Its plot follows the titular Roy, who, along with Dr. Faz and psychologist Elena, travels to a distant planet and faces an evil emperor who wants to conquer the Earth. Roy del espacio premiered on 3 March 1983, playing in several theatres in Mexico.

Retrospective reviews of Roy del espacio have referred to it as "an example of artistic ineptitude" and "a real disaster". It is now considered a lost film; only still images from the film are known to survive.

See also
 List of lost films

References

1983 films
1983 animated films
Mexican animated films
Mexican science fiction films
1980s lost films
1980s Mexican films
Lost animated films